Carlos Justiniano Ribeiro Chagas, or Carlos Chagas (July 9, 1879 – November 8, 1934), was a Brazilian sanitary physician, scientist, and bacteriologist who worked as a clinician and researcher. He discovered Chagas disease, also called American trypanosomiasis, in 1909, while he was working at the Oswaldo Cruz Institute in Rio de Janeiro.

Chagas's work holds a unique place in the history of medicine. Working in primitive conditions, Chagas described in detail a previously-unknown infectious disease, its pathogen, vector (Triatominae), host, clinical manifestations, and epidemiology. Chagas was also the first to discover and illustrate the parasitic fungal genus Pneumocystis, which later became infamous for being linked to pneumocystis pneumonia in AIDS patients.

Early life

Chagas was the son of José Justiniano das Chagas, a coffee farmer from Minas Gerais, and Mariana Cândida Chagas, both of Portuguese descent. After his secondary studies at Itu, São Paulo and São João del Rei, he enrolled in the School of Mining Engineering at Ouro Preto, but changed to the Medical School of Rio de Janeiro in 1897, influenced by his uncle, who was a physician and owner of a hospital in that city. He graduated in 1902 and got his M.D. the following year with a thesis on the hematology of malaria, working at the new medical research institute created by noted physician, and later friend and colleague, Oswaldo Cruz (1872–1917).

After a brief stint as a medical practitioner in the hinterlands, Chagas accepted a position in the port authority of Santos, São Paulo, with the mission of fighting the malaria epidemic, which was affecting its workers. There, he introduced an innovation, which consisted in using pyrethrum, an insecticide, to treat households, with surprising success. His published work on this method served as the basis of prevention of malaria all over the world, and was adopted by a service of the Ministry of Health in Brazil, which was established expressly for this purpose.

Discovery of Chagas disease

In 1906, Chagas returned to Rio de Janeiro and joined the Oswaldo Cruz Institute, where he remained working for the rest of his life. In 1909, he was sent by the institute to the small city of Lassance, near the São Francisco River, to combat a malaria outbreak among the workers of a new railroad to the city of Belém in the Amazon. He stayed there for the next two years, and soon was able to observe the peculiar infestation of the rural houses with a large hematophagous insect of the genus Triatoma, a kind of "assassin bug" or "kissing" bug (barbeiro or "barber" in Portuguese, so-called because it sucked the blood at night by biting the faces of its victims). He discovered that the intestines of these insects harbored flagellate protozoans, a new species of the genus Trypanosoma, and was able to prove experimentally that it could be transmitted to marmoset monkeys that were bitten by the infected bug. Chagas named this new parasite Trypanosoma cruzi  in honor of Oswaldo Cruz and later that year as Schizotrypanum cruzi  and then once again as Trypanosoma cruzi.

Chagas suspected that the parasite could cause human disease, due to the prevalence of the insect vector in human households and its habit of biting people, so he took blood samples and, on April 23, 1909, discovered for the first time the same Trypanosoma parasite in the blood of a 3-year-old girl. He also observed parasitic inclusions in the brain and myocardium that would explain some of the clinical manifestations in diseased people and closed the proposed lifecycle of the parasite by suggesting that the armadillo could be its natural reservoir. To complete his work on the pathology of the new disease, Chagas described 27 cases of the acute form of the disease and performed more than 100 autopsies on patients who exhibited the chronic form.

His description of the new disease was to become a classic in medicine, and brought him domestic and international distinction. He was elected to the National Academy of Medicine and received the prestigious Schaudinn Prize for the best work in protozoology and tropical medicine, on June 22, 1912. The contenders included Paul Ehrlich (1854–1915), Emile Roux (1853–1933), Ilya Mechnikov (1845–1916), Charles Laveran (1845–1922), Charles Nicolle (1866–1936), and Sir William Boog Leishman (1865–1926), several of whom had already received or would receive the Nobel Prize for Medicine.

Chagas also persuaded Argentine physician Salvador Mazza to research the epidemic, leading to the latter's confirmation of the existence of Trypanosoma cruzi in Argentina in 1927, and eventually to government action.

Chagas was also the first to discover the parasitic fungal genus Pneumocystis in the lungs of his experimentally trypanosome-infected animals. At the time, he did not recognize it as a separate organism, so he described his genus Schizotrypanum to accommodate both lifecycles that he illustrated beautifully. However, his discovery led others to further investigate and describe Pneumocystis as a distinct genus, which is now known to be a fungus. Chagas followed the literature closely and quickly confirmed the distinction, whereupon he again adopted the name Trypanosoma cruzi that he had originally coined. Pneumocystis is now linked to another disease, pneumocystis pneumonia, caused by one species (P. jirovecii), but the original Pneumocystis species seen by Chagas in guinea pigs has not yet been named as a separate species.

Later life

After the death of his mentor in 1917, Chagas accepted Cruz's directorship of the institute, a post he held until his death in 1934. From 1920 to 1924, he became the director of the Department of Health in Brazil. Chagas was very active in organizing special health-care and prevention services and campaigns for the Spanish flu epidemics, sexually transmitted diseases, leprosy, pediatrics, tuberculosis, and rural endemic diseases. He created a nursing school and was the founder of the concept of sanitary medicine, the first chairman of tropical medicine and the graduate study of hygiene.

Chagas died in Rio de Janeiro from a heart attack in 1934 at 55 years of age.

One of his sons, Carlos Chagas Filho (1910–2000), became an eminent and internationally recognized scientist in the field of neurophysiology and president of the Pontifical Academy of Sciences. Another son, Evandro Chagas (1905–1940), was also a physician and researcher in tropical medicine, who died in a plane crash at 35 years of age. His name is honoured by the important biomedical institution Instituto Evandro Chagas, in Belém, state of Pará.

Nobel Prize controversy

Chagas' discovery was recognized at home and abroad as one of the most important achievements in parasitology. He was twice nominated for the Nobel Prize in Physiology or Medicine (in 1913 and 1921), each time by only a single Brazilian nominator, but he never received the award. In 1913, 63 scientists were nominated for the Nobel Prize in Physiology or Medicine, the top two nominees having received nine and eight nominations, respectively. In 1921, 42 scientists were nominated for the award, the top four nominees having received 11, nine, seven, and seven nominations, respectively. A hundred years after the discovery of the disease, speculation still remains regarding the two official nominations of Carlos Chagas for the Nobel Prize. The reason why the prize was not awarded to Chagas may have been the strong opposition that he faced in Brazil, from some physicians and researchers of that time. They went as far as questioning the existence of Chagas disease, thereby possibly influencing the decision of the Nobel Committee not to award the prize to him. Analysis of the database of the Nobel Prize archives, with the revelation of the names of nominators, nominees, and prizewinners from 1901 to 1951, brought information not only about what was considered to be a scientific achievement at that time, but also about who the important scientists were and the relationships between them. The connections of the members of the Nobel Committee with the international scientific community, almost exclusively centered in European and North American scientists, also influenced their choices. The nonrecognition of Carlos Chagas' discoveries by the Nobel Committee appears to be more correctly explained by these factors than by the negative impact of the local opposition.

References

Further reading

 
 
  (Internet Archive)

External links

 Carlos Justiniano Ribeiro Chagas. WhoNamedIt.
 Dr. Carlos Chagas
 Historical aspects of Chagas disease. Instituto Oswaldo Cruz.

Brazilian bacteriologists
Brazilian entomologists
Brazilian parasitologists
1879 births
1934 deaths
20th-century Brazilian scientists
Chagas disease